Karl Ludwig Bernays (November 21, 1815 – June 22, 1876), baptized Ferdinand Cölestin Bernays and also known as Charles Louis Bernays, was a German journalist and associate of Karl Marx. Emigrating to the United States in the late 1840s, he worked as a journalist in Missouri and held a number of important positions in the Republican Party.

Biography
Bernays was born in Mainz, Germany, one of eight children of merchant Klemenz Bernays and his wife Theres Kreuznach (Creizenach). The family was Jewish but converted to Christianity while Bernays was still a child, and he was baptized Ferdinand Cölestin Bernays. They moved to Oggersheim, where Bernays attended a Catholic elementary school. He later went to a Protestant school in Frankfurt and went on to graduate from a school in Speyer. Bernays began studying law at the Ludwig Maximilian University in Munich and then transferred to the University of Göttingen. Sometime during his university years, he lost an eye in a duel. He received his doctorate in 1844 from Heidelberg University.

Bernays became a journalist for the Deutsch–Französische Jahrbücher (German–French Annals), which was published in Paris by Karl Marx and Arnold Ruge. When it folded, he became the editor of its successor, Vorwärts! (Forward).  In 1844, the newspaper was suppressed by the French government and Bernays was sent to prison for two months. On his release, he took refuge with fellow journalist Henry Boernstein, whose foster daughter Josephine 'Pepi' Wolf he later married.

After the French Revolution of 1848 resulted in the establishment of the French Second Republic, Bernays became an official under the new regime and was sent to Vienna, Austria, as part of a legation. However, when Boernstein decided to emigrate to the United States in 1849, Bernays also decided on emigration, taking ship for St. Louis, Missouri with his family and changing his name to Charles Louis Bernays. A cholera outbreak in St. Louis decided him to settle instead in Highland, Illinois, where he got temporary work as a merchant and brewer, eventually establishing the Highland Brewery. After Boernstein arrived in St. Louis and took over the local German-language newspaper Anzeiger des Westens ("Western Reporter"), Bernays moved back to St. Louis to work as an editor for the paper. He also wrote for the English-language Missouri Republican.

During the 1860 presidential election, Bernays served as secretary of the Missouri Republican Party. He became friendly with President Abraham Lincoln, and in 1861 the president posted him to Zurich, Switzerland, and later Helsinki, Finland, as a consul. Bernays apparently did not enjoy these postings (there were protests over his Jewish background) and returned to the United States to resume work as a journalist. During the Civil War, he served as an army paymaster, with the rank of lieutenant colonel.

Around 1870, Bernays withdrew from public life and began to write his autobiography. Due to illness, he left this project unfinished. He died in St. Louis in 1876.

Personal life
Bernays' wife, Josephine Wolf, was a singer and dancer. They had a daughter, Theresa, whose son, Louis C. Spiering, would be one of the chief architects of the 1904 St. Louis World's Fair.

References

Further reading
 "Bernays, Charles Louis". Gateway. The Magazine of the Missouri History Museum 22 (2002) 3, p. 12.
 Sugar, Adolph E. The Forty-Eighters: Political Refugees of the German Revolution of 1848. Russell & Russell, New York 1967.

1815 births
1876 deaths
19th-century American journalists
American male journalists
19th-century German journalists
European newspaper editors
Writers from Mainz
German-American Forty-Eighters
19th-century American diplomats
19th-century male writers
People of Missouri in the American Civil War
People of the Revolutions of 1848
People from Highland, Illinois